Rinaldo Rigola (2 February 1868 – 10 January 1954) was an Italian socialist politician who served as the founding secretary general of the General Confederation of Labour in 1906.

Biography
Rigola was born in Biella 2 February 1868. He was a metal worker. He became a member of the Italian Workers' Party in 1886. He left the party and joined the Italian Socialist Party in 1893. In the party Rigola was part of its reformist faction. He served as the municipal councilor in Biella in 1895 and as the director of the newspaper Corriere Biellese in 1896. The same year he was forced to exile and settled in Switzerland where he stayed until 1900. Shortly after his return to Italy he was elected a deputy being the first Italian worker at the Parliament. He wrote about trade union topics in the newspaper Avanti and then directed a magazine entitled Vita workeria.

In 1903 Rigola lost his sight completely as a result of an accident during his youth. In 1906 he became founding secretary general of the General Confederation of Labour. Rigola resigned from the post in 1918. In 1922 he cofounded the Unitary Socialist Party. Rigola launched a magazine entitled Il Lavoro in Biella in 1924. He also headed a cultural organization, the National Association for the Questions of Labour, which was associated with the magazine. He retired from public life in 1940 and died in Milan on 10 January 1954.

Views and legacy
Rigola was a supporter of the guild socialism developed by G.D.H. Cole. He did not openly approve the Fascist corporatism. In 2012 a biography of Rigola was published, Rinaldo Rigola. Una biografia politica, by Paolo Mattera.

References

External links

19th-century Italian journalists
20th-century Italian journalists
1868 births
1954 deaths
Italian Socialist Party politicians
Exiled Italian politicians
Italian magazine founders
Italian political party founders
Unitary Socialist Party (Italy, 1922) politicians
Blind politicians
People from Biella
Deputies of Legislature XXI of the Kingdom of Italy
Deputies of Legislature XXII of the Kingdom of Italy